The three-spined cardinalfish (Apogonops anomalus) is a species of fish in the family Acropomatidae, the temperate ocean-basses or lanternbellies. It is endemic to the marine waters off of Australia.

It grows to a length of  SL.

Hector's lanternfish (Lampanyctodes hectoris) is an important part of its diet.

Some authorities consider Apogonops to be a synonym of Verilus.

References

Acropomatidae
Fish of Australia
Fish described in 1896